Kidmore End is a village and civil parish in South Oxfordshire, centred  NNW of Reading, Berkshire, an important regional centre of commerce, research and engineering. It is in the low Chiltern Hills, partly in the Area of Outstanding Natural Beauty. The A4074 from Reading towards Oxford passes through the west of the parish and it is located 6 miles from Henley on Thames.

Amenities and geography
The village is dispersed into four built-up streets or small clusters of homes and has half-timbered cottages, housing ranging from early Georgian to a few late 20th century and early 21st century homes  and a public house, the New Inn. The Church of England parish church of Saint John the Baptist, designed by Arthur Billing, was built in 1852. The village school was opened in 1856 and is now a Church of England primary school. Kidmore End Cricket Club plays in the Thames Valley Cricket League.

Land use
The land use statistics published with the 2011 census show that the area was mostly greenspace, which is agriculture and woodland in this area, with the next highest land use category being domestic gardens, followed by roads, non-domestic buildings and domestic buildings.

Nearest places

References

Sources

External links

Civil parishes in Oxfordshire
Villages in Oxfordshire